Reeltown is a census-designated place and unincorporated community in Tallapoosa County, Alabama, United States. Its population was 766 as of the 2010 census.

The "Reel" in Reeltown is a misspelling of "Real" from the last name of settlers James Patrick and Phillip O'Real.  The town was called Thaddeus from 1880 to 1902 in honor of postmaster Thaddeus P. Webster.  The name changed back to Reeltown in 1902.

This is also the home of Reeltown High School, notable for winning the state football championship in 1987 in the 2A division, 2001 in the 1A division, and 2009 in the 2A division. In addition, Reeltown has two notable head football coaches with over 200 career wins.
 Duane Webster: (218-93-9)1956-1987
 Jackie O'Neal: (241-110-0) 1988-2015

Reeltown High School also had  four former students serve as Alabama FFA Association State Officers.
 Mickey Humphries(Alabama FFA State Vice President 1963–1964)
 Lacey Newman(Alabama FFA State Secretary 2014–2015)
 Torran Smith(Alabama FFA State Sentinel 2016–2017)(First African American Alabama FFA Central District President 2015–2016)
 KaShiya McKinney (Alabama FFA State Reporter 2019-2020 and 2021 Alabama National Officer Candidate)

Reeltown is also home to the Southeastern Kiwi Farming Cooperative, the only Kiwi Farm in the state of Alabama.

Demographics

References

Census-designated places in Tallapoosa County, Alabama
Census-designated places in Alabama